"Paper Plane" is a rock song originally by Status Quo.  It was released as a single on 10 November 1972, reaching number 8 in the UK Singles Chart, and appeared on their album, Piledriver. The song was written by Francis Rossi and Bob Young.

The song was reprised, in 2014, for the band's thirty-first studio album Aquostic (Stripped Bare). It was featured in the ninety-minute launch performance of the album at London's Roundhouse on 22 October, the concert being recorded and broadcast live by BBC Radio 2 as part of their In Concert series. 

In 2007 the song was covered by Persephone's Bees.

Singles
1972: Paper Plane / Softer Ride [p] 45 rpm Vinyl 7"; Vertigo / 6059 071  United Kingdom
1972: Paper Plane / All the Reasons 45 rpm Vinyl 7"; A&M  United States
1972: Paper Plane / Don't Waste My Time 45 rpm Vinyl 7"; Vertigo / SFL-1792 Japan

Charts

References

Status Quo (band) songs
1972 singles
Songs written by Francis Rossi
Songs written by Bob Young (musician)
1972 songs
Vertigo Records singles